Angèle Caroline Liliane Josette Marie-José DeGeest (Antwerp 23 October 1925 - Augsburg 22 December 2001) was a Belgian singer and actress. Durand was a popular singer in Germany during the early 1950s.

Filmography
Captain Bay-Bay (1953) by Helmut Käutner
Dancing in the Sun (1954) by Géza von Cziffra
A Girl from Paris (1954)
The Mistress of Solderhof (1955)
 (1958)
 (Five Sinners, 1959)
 Hula-Hopp, Conny (1959)
 The Scarlet Baroness (1959)
Hit Parade 1960 (1960)
Das Rätsel der grünen Spinne (1960)
 (1960)
The Bellboy and the Playgirls (1962) by Francis Ford Coppola
 Don't Fool with Me (1962)
 I’m an Antistar (1976) by Rosa von Praunheim

References

1925 births
2001 deaths
20th-century Belgian women singers
20th-century Belgian singers